Oakland Female Seminary (also Oakland Seminary for Young Ladies) was a private girls' school located in the U.S. state of California. Situated at 528 Eleventh Street in  Oakland, it contained 57 rooms. Founded on November 8, 1858, by Millicent Kittredge Blake, it was the first girls' school established west of the Mississippi River. Carrie Stevens Walter was the valedictorian of the first graduating class.

References

Attribution

Bibliography

External links

Schools in Oakland, California
Defunct private schools in California
1858 establishments in California
Educational institutions established in 1858
Girls' schools in California
19th century in Oakland, California